Goicea is a commune in Dolj County, Oltenia, Romania. Its existence was first attested in 1575. It is composed of two villages, Dunăreni and Goicea. It also included Cârna village until 2004, when it was split off to form a separate commune.

References

Communes in Dolj County
Localities in Oltenia